Girish Gautam is an Indian politician and Member of Madhya Pradesh Legislative Assembly from Deotalab Assembly constituency who is serving as Speaker of Madhya Pradesh Legislative Assembly.

Personal life 
He was born on 28 March 1953 in Rewa, Madhya Pradesh.

References 

1953 births
Members of the Madhya Pradesh Legislative Assembly
Living people
Speakers of the Madhya Pradesh Legislative Assembly